The 1930 Rollins Tars football team was an American football team that represented Rollins College as a member of the Southern Intercollegiate Athletic Association (SIAA) during the 1930 college football season. Led by Jack McDowall in his second season as head coach, the Tars compiled an overall record of 2–1–3.

Schedule

References

Rollins
Rollins Tars football seasons
Rollins Tars football